Tighe Rock is a rock outcropping along the coastal slope at the west margin of the Hudson Mountains, located 15 nautical miles (28 km) northwest of Mount Moses. Mapped by United States Geological Survey (USGS) from surveys and U.S. Navy air photos, 1960–66. Named by Advisory Committee on Antarctic Names (US-ACAN) for Robert F. Tighe, electrical engineer at Byrd Station, 1964–65.

Hudson Mountains
Rock formations of Ellsworth Land
Volcanoes of Ellsworth Land